Snork may refer to:

Snorks, a comic book, and later a cartoon series that began in the mid 80's and ended by the late 80's.
Snork Maiden, a member of the species known as Snorks and a character in the writings and illustrations of Tove Jansson
Snork, a member of the species known as Snorks and a character in the writings and illustrations of Tove Jansson. Brother of Snork Maiden.
Snork, an English/Belgian punk/prog rock band fronted by Elle Revel who played the 2013 GU1 festival in protest at the alleged "corporate takeover" of Guilfest

See also
Snark (disambiguation)